Koyra may  refer to:

Koyra Chiini language, spoken in Mali
Koyra language or Koore language, spoken in Ethiopia
Koyra Upazila, in Khulna District, Bangladesh
Koyra, West Bengal, a census town in Barasat I CD Block, North 24 Parganas, West Bengal, India.